Antoni Bura (22 December 1898 – 13 December 1980) was a Polish bobsledder, mechanical engineer and independence activist. He competed in the four-man event at the 1928 Winter Olympics.

He was born in Karwina in the region of Cieszyn Silesia, a son of a carpenter. Bura graduated from Juliusz Słowacki Polish Grammar School in Orłowa, then from the mechanical engineering at the Lwów Polytechnic in Lwów. During World War I, he was conscripted to the Austro-Hungarian Army and joined the Polish Military Organisation. Afterwards, he volunteered for the Polish forces in the Polish-Soviet War. For his actions, he was later awarded the Cross of Valour.

References

1898 births
1980 deaths
Polish male bobsledders
Polish mechanical engineers
Olympic bobsledders of Poland
Bobsledders at the 1928 Winter Olympics
Sportspeople from Karviná
Polish people from Zaolzie
Austro-Hungarian military personnel of World War I
Polish Military Organisation members
Polish people of the Polish–Soviet War
Recipients of the Cross of Valour (Poland)
Lviv Polytechnic alumni